The World Chess Championship 1896–1897 was a match for the World Chess Championship, contested between Emanuel Lasker and Wilhelm Steinitz. It was played in Moscow between November 6, 1896, and January 14, 1897. Lasker won by a score of 10 wins to 2 (with 5 draws), thus retaining his title.

Lasker had won the world title from Steinitz in 1894, and this was his first time defending the world title. At the Saint Petersburg 1895–96 chess tournament, Steinitz came second behind Lasker, ahead of other potential challengers Harry Nelson Pillsbury and Mikhail Chigorin. This allowed Steinitz to raise support for a rematch.

Results

The first player to win 10 games would be champion. Lasker won by 10 games to 2, with 5 draws.

{| class="wikitable" style="text-align:center"
|+World Chess Championship Match 1897
|-
! !! 1 !! 2 !! 3 !! 4 !! 5 !! 6 !! 7 !! 8 !! 9 !! 10 !! 11 !! 12 !! 13 !! 14 !! 15 !! 16 !! 17 !! Wins !! Total
|-
| align=left | 
| 0 ||style="background:black; color:white"| 0 || 0 ||style="background:black; color:white"| 0 || = ||style="background:black; color:white"| 0 || =||style="background:black; color:white"| =|| =||style="background:black; color:white"| 0 || 0 ||style="background:black; color:white"| 1 || 1 ||style="background:black; color:white"| 0 || =||style="background:black; color:white"| 0 || 0 || 2 || 4½
|-
| align=left | 
|style="background:black; color:white"| 1 || 1 ||style="background:black; color:white"| 1 || 1 ||style="background:black; color:white"| =|| 1 ||style="background:black; color:white"| =|| =||style="background:black; color:white"| =|| 1 || style="background:black; color:white"| 1 || 0 ||style="background:black; color:white"| 0 || 1 ||style="background:black; color:white"| =|| 1 ||style="background:black; color:white"| 1 || 10 || 12½
|}

References

External links
 Games of the match at Chessgames.com

1897
1897 in chess
1897 in the Russian Empire
Chess in Russia
19th century in Moscow
January 1897 sports events